The list of shipwrecks in June 1939 includes ships sunk, foundered, grounded, or otherwise lost during June 1939.

1 June

2 June

5 June

8 June

10 June

12 June

14 June

15 June

16 June

17 June

18 June

19 June

21 June

22 June

23 June

24 June

26 June

27 June

28 June

30 June

References

1939-06
 06